Paula Posavec (born 26 August 1996) is a Croatian handball player for RK Krim and the Croatian national team.

She participated at the 2016 European Women's Handball Championship.

She is Stela Posavec's twin sister.

International honours
EHF European Cup:
Runner-up: 2021

References

External links

1996 births
Living people
Croatian female handball players
Twin sportspeople
Croatian twins
Sportspeople from Čakovec